The Internet 1996 World Exposition is a web site, distributed on 8 servers around the world in a "public park for the global village," which received 5 million visitors from 130 countries. In-kind contributions from sponsors included the first DS3 over the Pacific Ocean and two terabytes of disk drives.

Throughout the year, a variety of events brought the fair into the real world. Japan set up banners and parties in the Harajuku district of Tokyo, Taiwan opened public computers in 100 locations, and the Netherlands brought the fair to street festivals. At the end of the year, a closing ceremony was held in Tokyo, where the fair archives were archived to CD-ROM, blessed by a Shinto priest, and put in a time capsule.

References

External links
 The Internet 1996 World Exposition

Internet properties established in 1996
History websites